Abu Abdallah Mohammed ibn Qasim ibn Zakur (died 1708) was a Moroccan poet, historian and travel writer from Fes. He was a pupil of the school of Abu Ali al-Hassan al-Yusi. He wrote poetry, history, biographies, travel accounts, and books on grammar, rhetoric, law and theology. One of his travel accounts is about a journey he made to Algeria in 1682. His poems were published in a diwan.

References

Arthur Wormhoudt (ed. and transl.), Selections from the Diwan by Abu 'Abdallah Muhammed ibn Qasim Ibn Zakur, William Penn College, 1995, 
Poemas selectos de Ibn Zakur, Lo presenta texto arabe el Profesor Abdul-lah Gannun el Hassani, Publicaciones del Instituto General Franco para la Investigacion Hispano-Arabe, 1945
Abderahmane El Moudden, "The Ambivalence of Rihla: Community, Integration and Self-Definition in Moroccan Travel Accounts, 1300–1800", in: Muslim Travelers: Pilgimage, Migration and the Religious Imagination, ed. Dale F. Eickelman and James Piscatori, Berkeley and Los Angeles: University of California Press, 1990, 69–84
Viguera, María Jesús, "La "Historia" de Ibn Zakur : (traducción anotada del capítulo sobre los Benimerines)", Madrid : Asociación Nacional de Bibliotecarios, Archivos y, 1974, pp. 515–539 (from: Homenaje a Guillermo Guastavino miscelánea de estudios en el año de su jubilación como director de la Biblioteca Nacional)
Muhammad ibn Qasim Ibn Zakur, Al-Sani Al-Badi Fi Sharh Al-Hilliyah Dhat Al-Badi, Rabat, 

Moroccan travel writers
17th-century Moroccan poets
18th-century Moroccan historians
1708 deaths
People from Fez, Morocco
17th-century Moroccan historians
Year of birth unknown
18th-century Moroccan poets